Tim Geltz is a retired American soccer player who played professionally in the USISL A-League.

Geltz graduated from Bishop Moore High School in Orlando, Florida. Geltz was a four-time All State as well as a 1988 Parade Magazine High School All American and 1988 NSCAA High School All American soccer player. He also played for the United States men's national under-20 soccer team in 1987 and 1988. In 1994, Bishop Moore inducted Geltz into its Hall of Fame. Geltz attended the University of South Florida, playing on the men's soccer team from 1988 to 1991.

In 1992, Geltz turned professional with the Orlando Lions of the USISL. In 1994, he moved to the Cocoa Expos. In 1996, Geltz joined the Jacksonville Cyclones. In 1997, he began the season with the Orlando Sundogs but moved to the Nashville Metros at midseason. In 1998, he returned to Florida where he began playing for the Jacksonville Cyclones, then finished the season with the Orlando Nighthawks. In 1999, he ended his career with the Central Florida Kraze.

Geltz is the older brother of Amy Geltz, who played in the W-League.

References

Living people
American soccer players
Orlando City U-23 players
Cocoa Expos players
Jacksonville Cyclones players
Nashville Metros players
Orlando Lions (1992–1996) players
Orlando Sundogs players
Parade High School All-Americans (boys' soccer)
South Florida Bulls men's soccer players
USL League Two players
A-League (1995–2004) players
United States men's under-20 international soccer players
Bishop Moore High School alumni
Association football midfielders
Year of birth missing (living people)
Association football forwards
High school soccer coaches in the United States
Rollins Tars coaches